

Lea-Lei

|- class="vcard"
| class="fn org" | Lea
| class="adr" | Derbyshire
| class="note" | 
| class="note" | 
|- class="vcard"
| class="fn org" | Lea
| class="adr" | Devon
| class="note" | 
| class="note" | 
|- class="vcard"
| class="fn org" | Lea
| class="adr" | Herefordshire
| class="note" | 
| class="note" | 
|- class="vcard"
| class="fn org" | Lea
| class="adr" | Lancashire
| class="note" | 
| class="note" | 
|- class="vcard"
| class="fn org" | Lea
| class="adr" | Lincolnshire
| class="note" | 
| class="note" | 
|- class="vcard"
| class="fn org" | Lea (Lydham)
| class="adr" | Shropshire
| class="note" | 
| class="note" | 
|- class="vcard"
| class="fn org" | Lea (Pontesbury)
| class="adr" | Shropshire
| class="note" | 
| class="note" | 
|- class="vcard"
| class="fn org" | Lea
| class="adr" | Wiltshire
| class="note" | 
| class="note" | 
|- class="vcard"
| class="fn org" | Lea Bridge
| class="adr" | Hackney
| class="note" | 
| class="note" | 
|- class="vcard"
| class="fn org" | Leabrooks
| class="adr" | Derbyshire
| class="note" | 
| class="note" | 
|- class="vcard"
| class="fn org" | Lea by Backford
| class="adr" | Cheshire
| class="note" | 
| class="note" | 
|- class="vcard"
| class="fn org" | Leacainn
| class="adr" | Western Isles
| class="note" | 
| class="note" | 
|- class="vcard"
| class="fn org" | Leac a Li
| class="adr" | Western Isles
| class="note" | 
| class="note" | 
|- class="vcard"
| class="fn org" | Leacanashie
| class="adr" | Highland
| class="note" | 
| class="note" | 
|- class="vcard"
| class="fn org" | Leachkin
| class="adr" | Highland
| class="note" | 
| class="note" | 
|- class="vcard"
| class="fn org" | Leadburn
| class="adr" | Scottish Borders
| class="note" | 
| class="note" | 
|- class="vcard"
| class="fn org" | Leadendale
| class="adr" | Staffordshire
| class="note" | 
| class="note" | 
|- class="vcard"
| class="fn org" | Leadenham
| class="adr" | Lincolnshire
| class="note" | 
| class="note" | 
|- class="vcard"
| class="fn org" | Leaden Roding
| class="adr" | Essex
| class="note" | 
| class="note" | 
|- class="vcard"
| class="fn org" | Leadgate
| class="adr" | Cumbria
| class="note" | 
| class="note" | 
|- class="vcard"
| class="fn org" | Leadgate
| class="adr" | Durham
| class="note" | 
| class="note" | 
|- class="vcard"
| class="fn org" | Leadgate
| class="adr" | Gateshead
| class="note" | 
| class="note" | 
|- class="vcard"
| class="fn org" | Leadhills
| class="adr" | South Lanarkshire
| class="note" | 
| class="note" | 
|- class="vcard"
| class="fn org" | Leadingcross Green
| class="adr" | Kent
| class="note" | 
| class="note" | 
|- class="vcard"
| class="fn org" | Leadmill
| class="adr" | Derbyshire
| class="note" | 
| class="note" | 
|- class="vcard"
| class="fn org" | Leadmill
| class="adr" | Flintshire
| class="note" | 
| class="note" | 
|- class="vcard"
| class="fn org" | Lea End
| class="adr" | Worcestershire
| class="note" | 
| class="note" | 
|- class="vcard"
| class="fn org" | Leafield
| class="adr" | Oxfordshire
| class="note" | 
| class="note" | 
|- class="vcard"
| class="fn org" | Leafield
| class="adr" | Wiltshire
| class="note" | 
| class="note" | 
|- class="vcard"
| class="fn org" | Lea Forge
| class="adr" | Cheshire
| class="note" | 
| class="note" | 
|- class="vcard"
| class="fn org" | Leagrave
| class="adr" | Luton
| class="note" | 
| class="note" | 
|- class="vcard"
| class="fn org" | Leagreen
| class="adr" | Hampshire
| class="note" | 
| class="note" | 
|- class="vcard"
| class="fn org" | Lea Green
| class="adr" | St Helens
| class="note" | 
| class="note" | 
|- class="vcard"
| class="fn org" | Lea Hall
| class="adr" | Birmingham
| class="note" | 
| class="note" | 
|- class="vcard"
| class="fn org" | Lea Heath
| class="adr" | Staffordshire
| class="note" | 
| class="note" | 
|- class="vcard"
| class="fn org" | Leake
| class="adr" | Lincolnshire
| class="note" | 
| class="note" | 
|- class="vcard"
| class="fn org" | Leake
| class="adr" | North Yorkshire
| class="note" | 
| class="note" | 
|- class="vcard"
| class="fn org" | Leake Commonside
| class="adr" | Lincolnshire
| class="note" | 
| class="note" | 
|- class="vcard"
| class="fn org" | Leake Fold Hill
| class="adr" | Lincolnshire
| class="note" | 
| class="note" | 
|- class="vcard"
| class="fn org" | Lealholm
| class="adr" | North Yorkshire
| class="note" | 
| class="note" | 
|- class="vcard"
| class="fn org" | Lealholm Side
| class="adr" | North Yorkshire
| class="note" | 
| class="note" | 
|- class="vcard"
| class="fn org" | Lea Line
| class="adr" | Herefordshire
| class="note" | 
| class="note" | 
|- class="vcard"
| class="fn org" | Lealt
| class="adr" | Highland
| class="note" | 
| class="note" | 
|- class="vcard"
| class="fn org" | Leam
| class="adr" | Derbyshire
| class="note" | 
| class="note" | 
|- class="vcard"
| class="fn org" | Lea Marston
| class="adr" | Warwickshire
| class="note" | 
| class="note" | 
|- class="vcard"
| class="fn org" | Leamington Hastings
| class="adr" | Warwickshire
| class="note" | 
| class="note" | 
|- class="vcard"
| class="fn org" | Leamonsley
| class="adr" | Staffordshire
| class="note" | 
| class="note" | 
|- class="vcard"
| class="fn org" | Leamoor Common
| class="adr" | Shropshire
| class="note" | 
| class="note" | 
|- class="vcard"
| class="fn org" | Leamore
| class="adr" | Walsall
| class="note" | 
| class="note" | 
|- class="vcard"
| class="fn org" | Leamside
| class="adr" | Durham
| class="note" | 
| class="note" | 
|- class="vcard"
| class="fn org" | Leanach
| class="adr" | Highland
| class="note" | 
| class="note" | 
|- class="vcard"
| class="fn org" | Leapgate
| class="adr" | Worcestershire
| class="note" | 
| class="note" | 
|- class="vcard"
| class="fn org" | Leargybreck
| class="adr" | Argyll and Bute
| class="note" | 
| class="note" | 
|- class="vcard"
| class="fn org" | Lease Rigg
| class="adr" | North Yorkshire
| class="note" | 
| class="note" | 
|- class="vcard"
| class="fn org" | Leasey Bridge
| class="adr" | Hertfordshire
| class="note" | 
| class="note" | 
|- class="vcard"
| class="fn org" | Leasgill
| class="adr" | Cumbria
| class="note" | 
| class="note" | 
|- class="vcard"
| class="fn org" | Leasingham
| class="adr" | Lincolnshire
| class="note" | 
| class="note" | 
|- class="vcard"
| class="fn org" | Leasingthorne
| class="adr" | Durham
| class="note" | 
| class="note" | 
|- class="vcard"
| class="fn org" | Leason
| class="adr" | Swansea
| class="note" | 
| class="note" | 
|- class="vcard"
| class="fn org" | Leasowe
| class="adr" | Wirral
| class="note" | 
| class="note" | 
|- class="vcard"
| class="fn org" | Leatherhead
| class="adr" | Surrey
| class="note" | 
| class="note" | 
|- class="vcard"
| class="fn org" | Leatherhead Common
| class="adr" | Surrey
| class="note" | 
| class="note" | 
|- class="vcard"
| class="fn org" | Leathern Bottle
| class="adr" | Gloucestershire
| class="note" | 
| class="note" | 
|- class="vcard"
| class="fn org" | Leathley
| class="adr" | North Yorkshire
| class="note" | 
| class="note" | 
|- class="vcard"
| class="fn org" | Leaton (Wrockwardine)
| class="adr" | Shropshire
| class="note" | 
| class="note" | 
|- class="vcard"
| class="fn org" | Leaton (Pimhill)
| class="adr" | Shropshire
| class="note" | 
| class="note" | 
|- class="vcard"
| class="fn org" | Leaton Heath
| class="adr" | Shropshire
| class="note" | 
| class="note" | 
|- class="vcard"
| class="fn org" | Lea Town
| class="adr" | Lancashire
| class="note" | 
| class="note" | 
|- class="vcard"
| class="fn org" | Lea Valley
| class="adr" | Hertfordshire
| class="note" | 
| class="note" | 
|- class="vcard"
| class="fn org" | Leaveland
| class="adr" | Kent
| class="note" | 
| class="note" | 
|- class="vcard"
| class="fn org" | Leavenheath
| class="adr" | Suffolk
| class="note" | 
| class="note" | 
|- class="vcard"
| class="fn org" | Leavening
| class="adr" | North Yorkshire
| class="note" | 
| class="note" | 
|- class="vcard"
| class="fn org" | Leavesden
| class="adr" | Hertfordshire
| class="note" | 
| class="note" | 
|- class="vcard"
| class="fn org" | Leaves Green
| class="adr" | Bromley
| class="note" | 
| class="note" | 
|- class="vcard"
| class="fn org" | Lea Yeat
| class="adr" | Cumbria
| class="note" | 
| class="note" | 
|- class="vcard"
| class="fn org" | Lebberston
| class="adr" | North Yorkshire
| class="note" | 
| class="note" | 
|- class="vcard"
| class="fn org" | Leburnick
| class="adr" | Cornwall
| class="note" | 
| class="note" | 
|- class="vcard"
| class="fn org" | Lechlade
| class="adr" | Gloucestershire
| class="note" | 
| class="note" | 
|- class="vcard"
| class="fn org" | Leck
| class="adr" | Lancashire
| class="note" | 
| class="note" | 
|- class="vcard"
| class="fn org" | Leckford
| class="adr" | Hampshire
| class="note" | 
| class="note" | 
|- class="vcard"
| class="fn org" | Leckfurin
| class="adr" | Highland
| class="note" | 
| class="note" | 
|- class="vcard"
| class="fn org" | Leckhampstead
| class="adr" | Berkshire
| class="note" | 
| class="note" | 
|- class="vcard"
| class="fn org" | Leckhampstead
| class="adr" | Buckinghamshire
| class="note" | 
| class="note" | 
|- class="vcard"
| class="fn org" | Leckhampstead Thicket
| class="adr" | Berkshire
| class="note" | 
| class="note" | 
|- class="vcard"
| class="fn org" | Leckhampton
| class="adr" | Gloucestershire
| class="note" | 
| class="note" | 
|- class="vcard"
| class="fn org" | Leckmelm
| class="adr" | Highland
| class="note" | 
| class="note" | 
|- class="vcard"
| class="fn org" | Leckwith
| class="adr" | The Vale Of Glamorgan
| class="note" | 
| class="note" | 
|- class="vcard"
| class="fn org" | Leconfield
| class="adr" | East Riding of Yorkshire
| class="note" | 
| class="note" | 
|- class="vcard"
| class="fn org" | Ledaig (Ardchattan)
| class="adr" | Argyll and Bute
| class="note" | 
| class="note" | 
|- class="vcard"
| class="fn org" | Ledaig (Tobermory)
| class="adr" | Argyll and Bute
| class="note" | 
| class="note" | 
|- class="vcard"
| class="fn org" | Ledaig (Barra)
| class="adr" | Western Isles
| class="note" | 
| class="note" | 
|- class="vcard"
| class="fn org" | Ledburn
| class="adr" | Buckinghamshire
| class="note" | 
| class="note" | 
|- class="vcard"
| class="fn org" | Ledbury
| class="adr" | Herefordshire
| class="note" | 
| class="note" | 
|- class="vcard"
| class="fn org" | Leddington
| class="adr" | Gloucestershire
| class="note" | 
| class="note" | 
|- class="vcard"
| class="fn org" | Ledicot
| class="adr" | Herefordshire
| class="note" | 
| class="note" | 
|- class="vcard"
| class="fn org" | Lednabirichen
| class="adr" | Highland
| class="note" | 
| class="note" | 
|- class="vcard"
| class="fn org" | Lednagullin
| class="adr" | Highland
| class="note" | 
| class="note" | 
|- class="vcard"
| class="fn org" | Ledsham
| class="adr" | Cheshire
| class="note" | 
| class="note" | 
|- class="vcard"
| class="fn org" | Ledsham
| class="adr" | Leeds
| class="note" | 
| class="note" | 
|- class="vcard"
| class="fn org" | Ledston
| class="adr" | Leeds
| class="note" | 
| class="note" | 
|- class="vcard"
| class="fn org" | Ledstone
| class="adr" | Devon
| class="note" | 
| class="note" | 
|- class="vcard"
| class="fn org" | Ledston Luck
| class="adr" | Leeds
| class="note" | 
| class="note" | 
|- class="vcard"
| class="fn org" | Ledwell
| class="adr" | Oxfordshire
| class="note" | 
| class="note" | 
|- class="vcard"
| class="fn org" | Lee
| class="adr" | Argyll and Bute
| class="note" | 
| class="note" | 
|- class="vcard"
| class="fn org" | Lee (near Berrynarbor)
| class="adr" | Devon
| class="note" | 
| class="note" | 
|- class="vcard"
| class="fn org" | Lee (or Lee Bay, near Woolacombe)
| class="adr" | Devon
| class="adr" | 
| class="note" | 
|- class="vcard"
| class="fn org" | Lee
| class="adr" | Hampshire
| class="note" | 
| class="note" | 
|- class="vcard"
| class="fn org" | Lee
| class="adr" | Lewisham
| class="note" | 
| class="note" | 
|- class="vcard"
| class="fn org" | Lee
| class="adr" | Northumberland
| class="note" | 
| class="note" | 
|- class="vcard"
| class="fn org" | Lee
| class="adr" | Shropshire
| class="note" | 
| class="note" | 
|- class="vcard"
| class="fn org" | Leeans
| class="adr" | Shetland Islands
| class="note" | 
| class="note" | 
|- class="vcard"
| class="fn org" | Lee Bank
| class="adr" | Birmingham
| class="note" | 
| class="note" | 
|- class="vcard"
| class="fn org" | Leebotten
| class="adr" | Shetland Islands
| class="note" | 
| class="note" | 
|- class="vcard"
| class="fn org" | Leebotwood
| class="adr" | Shropshire
| class="note" | 
| class="note" | 
|- class="vcard"
| class="fn org" | Lee Brockhurst
| class="adr" | Shropshire
| class="note" | 
| class="note" | 
|- class="vcard"
| class="fn org" | Leece
| class="adr" | Cumbria
| class="note" | 
| class="note" | 
|- class="vcard"
| class="fn org" | Lee Chapel
| class="adr" | Essex
| class="note" | 
| class="note" | 
|- class="vcard"
| class="fn org" | Leechpool
| class="adr" | Monmouthshire
| class="note" | 
| class="note" | 
|- class="vcard"
| class="fn org" | Lee Clump
| class="adr" | Buckinghamshire
| class="note" | 
| class="note" | 
|- class="vcard"
| class="fn org" | Lee Common
| class="adr" | Buckinghamshire
| class="note" | 
| class="note" | 
|- class="vcard"
| class="fn org" | Leeds
| class="adr" | Kent
| class="note" | 
| class="note" | 
|- class="vcard"
| class="fn org" | Leeds
| class="adr" | City of Leeds
| class="note" | 
| class="note" | 
|- class="vcard"
| class="fn org" | Leedstown
| class="adr" | Cornwall
| class="note" | 
| class="note" | 
|- class="vcard"
| class="fn org" | Leeford
| class="adr" | Devon
| class="note" | 
| class="note" | 
|- class="vcard"
| class="fn org" | Lee Gate
| class="adr" | Buckinghamshire
| class="note" | 
| class="note" | 
|- class="vcard"
| class="fn org" | Leegomery
| class="adr" | Shropshire
| class="note" | 
| class="note" | 
|- class="vcard"
| class="fn org" | Lee Green
| class="adr" | Lewisham
| class="note" | 
| class="note" | 
|- class="vcard"
| class="fn org" | Lee Ground
| class="adr" | Hampshire
| class="note" | 
| class="note" | 
|- class="vcard"
| class="fn org" | Lee Head
| class="adr" | Derbyshire
| class="note" | 
| class="note" | 
|- class="vcard"
| class="fn org" | Leeholme
| class="adr" | Durham
| class="note" | 
| class="note" | 
|- class="vcard"
| class="fn org" | Leek
| class="adr" | Staffordshire
| class="note" | 
| class="note" | 
|- class="vcard"
| class="fn org" | Leekbrook
| class="adr" | Staffordshire
| class="note" | 
| class="note" | 
|- class="vcard"
| class="fn org" | Leek Wootton
| class="adr" | Warwickshire
| class="note" | 
| class="note" | 
|- class="vcard"
| class="fn org" | Lee Mill
| class="adr" | Devon
| class="note" | 
| class="note" | 
|- class="vcard"
| class="fn org" | Leeming
| class="adr" | Bradford
| class="note" | 
| class="note" | 
|- class="vcard"
| class="fn org" | Leeming
| class="adr" | North Yorkshire
| class="note" | 
| class="note" | 
|- class="vcard"
| class="fn org" | Leeming Bar
| class="adr" | North Yorkshire
| class="note" | 
| class="note" | 
|- class="vcard"
| class="fn org" | Leemings
| class="adr" | Lancashire
| class="note" | 
| class="note" | 
|- class="vcard"
| class="fn org" | Lee Moor
| class="adr" | Devon
| class="note" | 
| class="note" | 
|- class="vcard"
| class="fn org" | Lee Moor
| class="adr" | Wakefield
| class="note" | 
| class="note" | 
|- class="vcard"
| class="fn org" | Lee-on-the-Solent
| class="adr" | Hampshire
| class="note" | 
| class="note" | 
|- class="vcard"
| class="fn org" | Lee-over-Sands
| class="adr" | Essex
| class="note" | 
| class="note" | 
|- class="vcard"
| class="fn org" | Lees
| class="adr" | Derbyshire
| class="note" | 
| class="note" | 
|- class="vcard"
| class="fn org" | Lees
| class="adr" | Oldham
| class="note" | 
| class="note" | 
|- class="vcard"
| class="fn org" | Leesthorpe
| class="adr" | Leicestershire
| class="note" | 
| class="note" | 
|- class="vcard"
| class="fn org" | Leeswood (Coed-Llai)
| class="adr" | Sir y Fflint (Flintshire)
| class="note" | 
| class="note" | 
|- class="vcard"
| class="fn org" | Leetown
| class="adr" | Perth and Kinross
| class="note" | 
| class="note" | 
|- class="vcard"
| class="fn org" | Leftwich
| class="adr" | Cheshire
| class="note" | 
| class="note" | 
|- class="vcard"
| class="fn org" | Legar
| class="adr" | Powys
| class="note" | 
| class="note" | 
|- class="vcard"
| class="fn org" | Legbourne
| class="adr" | Lincolnshire
| class="note" | 
| class="note" | 
|- class="vcard"
| class="fn org" | Legburthwaite
| class="adr" | Cumbria
| class="note" | 
| class="note" | 
|- class="vcard"
| class="fn org" | Legerwood
| class="adr" | Scottish Borders
| class="note" | 
| class="note" | 
|- class="vcard"
| class="fn org" | Leggatt Hill
| class="adr" | West Sussex
| class="note" | 
| class="note" | 
|- class="vcard"
| class="fn org" | Legsby
| class="adr" | Lincolnshire
| class="note" | 
| class="note" | 
|- class="vcard"
| class="fn org" | Leicester
| class="adr" | City of Leicester
| class="note" | 
| class="note" | 
|- class="vcard"
| class="fn org" | Leicester Forest East
| class="adr" | Leicestershire
| class="note" | 
| class="note" | 
|- class="vcard"
| class="fn org" | Leicester Grange
| class="adr" | Warwickshire
| class="note" | 
| class="note" | 
|- class="vcard"
| class="fn org" | Leigh
| class="adr" | Devon
| class="note" | 
| class="note" | 
|- class="vcard"
| class="fn org" | Leigh (Ibberton, North Dorset)
| class="adr" | Dorset
| class="note" | 
| class="note" | 
|- class="vcard"
| class="fn org" | Leigh (West Dorset)
| class="adr" | Dorset
| class="note" | 
| class="note" | 
|- class="vcard"
| class="fn org" | Leigh
| class="adr" | Kent
| class="note" | 
| class="note" | 
|- class="vcard"
| class="fn org" | Leigh
| class="adr" | Poole, Dorset
| class="note" | 
| class="note" | 
|- class="vcard"
| class="fn org" | Leigh
| class="adr" | Shropshire
| class="note" | 
| class="note" | 
|- class="vcard"
| class="fn org" | Leigh
| class="adr" | Surrey
| class="note" | 
| class="note" | 
|- class="vcard"
| class="fn org" | Leigh
| class="adr" | Wigan
| class="note" | 
| class="note" | 
|- class="vcard"
| class="fn org" | Leigh
| class="adr" | Wiltshire
| class="note" | 
| class="note" | 
|- class="vcard"
| class="fn org" | Leigh
| class="adr" | Worcestershire
| class="note" | 
| class="note" | 
|- class="vcard"
| class="fn org" | Leigham
| class="adr" | Devon
| class="note" | 
| class="note" | 
|- class="vcard"
| class="fn org" | Leigh Beck
| class="adr" | Essex
| class="note" | 
| class="note" | 
|- class="vcard"
| class="fn org" | Leigh Common
| class="adr" | Somerset
| class="note" | 
| class="note" | 
|- class="vcard"
| class="fn org" | Leigh Delamere
| class="adr" | Wiltshire
| class="note" | 
| class="note" | 
|- class="vcard"
| class="fn org" | Leigh Green
| class="adr" | Kent
| class="note" | 
| class="note" | 
|- class="vcard"
| class="fn org" | Leighland Chapel
| class="adr" | Somerset
| class="note" | 
| class="note" | 
|- class="vcard"
| class="fn org" | Leigh-on-Sea
| class="adr" | Essex
| class="note" | 
| class="note" | 
|- class="vcard"
| class="fn org" | Leigh Park
| class="adr" | Hampshire
| class="note" | 
| class="note" | 
|- class="vcard"
| class="fn org" | Leigh Sinton
| class="adr" | Worcestershire
| class="note" | 
| class="note" | 
|- class="vcard"
| class="fn org" | Leighswood
| class="adr" | Walsall
| class="note" | 
| class="note" | 
|- class="vcard"
| class="fn org" | Leighterton
| class="adr" | Gloucestershire
| class="note" | 
| class="note" | 
|- class="vcard"
| class="fn org" | Leighton
| class="adr" | North Yorkshire
| class="note" | 
| class="note" | 
|- class="vcard"
| class="fn org" | Leighton
| class="adr" | Powys
| class="note" | 
| class="note" | 
|- class="vcard"
| class="fn org" | Leighton
| class="adr" | Shropshire
| class="note" | 
| class="note" | 
|- class="vcard"
| class="fn org" | Leighton
| class="adr" | Somerset
| class="note" | 
| class="note" | 
|- class="vcard"
| class="fn org" | Leighton Bromswold
| class="adr" | Cambridgeshire
| class="note" | 
| class="note" | 
|- class="vcard"
| class="fn org" | Leighton Buzzard
| class="adr" | Bedfordshire
| class="note" | 
| class="note" | 
|- class="vcard"
| class="fn org" | Leightonhill
| class="adr" | Angus
| class="note" | 
| class="note" | 
|- class="vcard"
| class="fn org" | Leigh upon Mendip
| class="adr" | Somerset
| class="note" | 
| class="note" | 
|- class="vcard"
| class="fn org" | Leigh Woods
| class="adr" | North Somerset
| class="note" | 
| class="note" | 
|- class="vcard"
| class="fn org" | Leinthall Earls
| class="adr" | Herefordshire
| class="note" | 
| class="note" | 
|- class="vcard"
| class="fn org" | Leinthall Starkes
| class="adr" | Herefordshire
| class="note" | 
| class="note" | 
|- class="vcard"
| class="fn org" | Leintwardine
| class="adr" | Herefordshire
| class="note" | 
| class="note" | 
|- class="vcard"
| class="fn org" | Leire
| class="adr" | Leicestershire
| class="note" | 
| class="note" | 
|- class="vcard"
| class="fn org" | Leirinmore
| class="adr" | Highland
| class="note" | 
| class="note" | 
|- class="vcard"
| class="fn org" | Leiston
| class="adr" | Suffolk
| class="note" | 
| class="note" | 
|- class="vcard"
| class="fn org" | Leitfie
| class="adr" | Perth and Kinross
| class="note" | 
| class="note" | 
|- class="vcard"
| class="fn org" | Leith
| class="adr" | City of Edinburgh
| class="note" | 
| class="note" | 
|- class="vcard"
| class="fn org" | Leitholm
| class="adr" | Scottish Borders
| class="note" | 
| class="note" | 
|}